Nicolas Kirsch (28 August 1901 – 29 September 1983) was a Luxembourgian footballer. He competed at the 1924 Summer Olympics and the 1928 Summer Olympics.

References

External links

1901 births
1983 deaths
Luxembourgian footballers
Luxembourg international footballers
Olympic footballers of Luxembourg
Footballers at the 1924 Summer Olympics
Footballers at the 1928 Summer Olympics
Sportspeople from Luxembourg City
Association football defenders
CA Spora Luxembourg players